The Order of King Abdulaziz is a Saudi Arabian order of merit. The order was named after Abdulaziz Al Saud, founder of the modern Saudi state.

History
In 1971, the introduction of orders was announced in a decree. It was instituted by King Faisal on 20 March 1971. However, the order had been awarded before that date unsystematically. These earliest versions were produced by Bichay in Cairo, Egypt. The early version of the order was called Great Chain of Badr. The Saudi king, Fons honorum of the orders, confirmed the decree in his Royal decree.

Collar of the Order of Abdul Aziz Al Saud

The collar is regarded as a separate order. It also confers the highest rank in the Order of Abdulaziz Al Saud, and, unlike the Great Chain of Badr, is awarded to non-Muslim heads of state.

The Order of Abdulaziz Al Saud
The order is awarded to citizens of Saudi Arabia and foreigners for meritorious service to the Kingdom. The Council of Ministers makes the nominations but the King confers awards to foreigners himself when he determines it to be appropriate. Awardees enter in the 4th class of the order, with the exception of ministers and appointees for bravery, who can enter the order in a higher class. Members of the order can advance to the next higher class every five years.

The number of Saudi conferments is limited annually. The statutes of the order stipulate no more than 20 grand sashes of the distinguished class. Up to 40, 60, 80 and 100 awards can be granted to members of the 1st, 2nd, 3rd and 4th classes, respectively.

Classes
The Classes include: 
Special Class (comparable with "Grand Cordon"). A sash with pendant is worn on the right shoulder, plus a star on the left chest;
Distinguished First Class (comparable with "Grand Officer"). The insignia is worn on a necklet, plus a golden star on the left chest;
First Class (comparable with "Commander 1st Class"). The insignia is worn on a necklet, plus a silver star on the left chest;
Second Class (comparable with "Commander"). The insignia is worn on a necklet;
Third Class (comparable with "Officer"). A badge is worn on a ribbon with a rosette on the left chest;
Fourth Class (comparable with "Knight"). A badge is worn on a ribbon on the left chest.

The Saudis avoid words like "cross" (as in "Grand-Cross") and "knight".

The order is sometimes referred to as the:

 King Abdulaziz Order of Merit
 King Abdulaziz Al Saud Excellence Medal
 King Abdulaziz Medal

Notable recipients

Saudi royalty
Bandar bin Sultan Al Saud
 King Faisal
 Fahd bin Abdullah bin Mohammed Al Saud
 Muqrin bin Abdulaziz Al Saud
 Nayef bin Abdulaziz Al Saud – King Abdulaziz Medal (First Class)
 Sara bint Faisal bin Abdulaziz – King Abdulaziz Medal (First Class; 2013)
 Sattam bin Abdulaziz Al Saud – King Abdulaziz Medal (First Class)
 Khalid bin Bandar Al Saud (2011)
 Sultan bin Abdulaziz Al Saud – King Abdulaziz Medal (First Class; 2011)
 Turki bin Nasser Al Saud – King Abdulaziz Medal (First Class)
 Al Waleed bin Talal Al Saud – King Abdulaziz Medal (First Class; 2002)
 Talal bin Abdulaziz Al Saud – King Abdulaziz Sash (Special Class; 1976)

Politicians and officials

Abiy Ahmed – Prime Minister of Ethiopia (16 September 2018)
 Beji Caid Essebsi – President of Tunisia (29 March 2019)
 Isaias Afwerki – President of Eritrea (16 September 2018)
 Petro Poroshenko – President of Ukraine (1 November 2017)
 Donald Trump – Former President of the United States of America, Collar of Abdulaziz Al Saud (20 May 2017)
 Theresa May – Former Prime Minister of the United Kingdom (6 April 2017) 
 Narendra Modi – Prime Minister of India, Order of Abdulaziz Al Saud (Special Class, 3 April 2016)
 Haifa al-Mogrin
 Jacob Zuma – President of South Africa (28 March 2016) 
 Xi Jinping – President of China and General Secretary of the Chinese Communist Party, Medal of King Abdulaziz (20 January 2016)
 Enrique Peña Nieto – President of Mexico, Order of Abdulaziz Al Saud (Special Class, 17 January 2016)
 Joko Widodo – President of Indonesia, Medal of King Abdulaziz (First Class, September 2015)
 Abdel Fattah el-Sisi – President of Egypt, Medal of King Abdulaziz (First Class; August 2014)
 François Hollande – Former President of France, (Special Class, 30 December 2013)
 David Cameron – Former Prime Minister of the United Kingdom (8 November 2012)
 Najib Tun Razak – Former Prime Minister of Malaysia, Medal of King Abdulaziz (First Class, 19 January 2010)
 Giorgio Napolitano - Former President of Italy, Collar of the Order of Abdulaziz Al Saud (5 November 2007)
 Silvio Berlusconi – Former Prime Minister of Italy, Order of Abdulaziz Al Saud (First Class; 22 November 2009)
 Bashar al-Assad – President of Syria, Medal of King Abdulaziz (8 October 2009)
 Barack Obama – Former President of the United States, King Abdul Aziz Order of Merit (June 2009)
 Mohammad Al Jasser – Saudi minister, Medal of King Abdulaziz (First Class; May 2009)
 George W. Bush – Former President of the United States, Medal of King Abdulaziz (First Class; 14 January 2008) 
 Mohammed VI – King of Morocco (18 May 2007)
 Carl XVI Gustaf - King of Sweden, Grand Cross with Collar of the Order of Abdulaziz al Saud
 Shinzō Abe – Prime Minister of Japan, Order of Abdulaziz Al Saud (Special Class; April 2007)
Vladimir Putin – President of Russia (12 February 2007)
 Sabah Al Khalid Al Sabah – Kuwaiti royal and politician, Medal of King Abdulaziz (First Class)
 Edmond Leburton – Former Prime Minister of Belgium
 Bill Clinton – Former President of the United States
 Gyanendra of Nepal – Former King of Nepal
 Hussein bin Talal - Former King of the Hashemite Kingdom of Jordan, Collar of Abdulaziz Al Saud (1960)
 Hosni Mubarak - Former President of Egypt
 Mohammed bin Ali Aba Al Khail – Former Saudi Finance Minister, 2nd Class Sash
 Ray Mabus – Former ambassador of the United States to Saudi Arabia (April 1996) 
 Shakhbout bin Nahyan bin Mubarak Al Nahyan – Former ambassador of the United Arab Emirates to Saudi Arabia, 2nd Class Sash (February 2021)
 Syed Nasir Ali Rizvi - Former Federal Minister of Pakistan for Housing and Urban development (1976)
 Halimah Yacob – President of Singapore (6 November 2019)
 Haitham bin Tariq – Sultan of Oman, (11 July 2021)

Military
 Mohammed Aly Fahmy – Egyptian Air Force Chief (First class) 
 Qamar Javed Bajwa – Pakistan's Chief of Army Chief of Army Staff 2022
 Pervez Musharraf – Pakistan's President & Chief of Army Staff
 Raheel Sharif – Pakistan's Chief of Army Staff
 Qamar Javed Bajwa – Pakistan's Chief of Army Staff
 Lt. Gen Mian Muhammad Afzaal (Shaheed) – Pakistan Army's Chief Of General Staff - (1987)
 Tariq Majid – Pakistan's Chairman of the Joint Chiefs of Staff Committee (2009)
 Lt. General James Ahmann – US Air Force Commander USMTM 
 Ali Shamkhani – Former Defence Minister of Iran
 Sir Alan William John West – Chief of British Naval Staff (2004), Medal of King Abdulaziz (First Class)
 Katsutoshi Kawano – Chief of Staff of the Japan Maritime Self-Defense Force (February 2014)
 Stephane Abrial – Former SACT
 Denis Mercier – Former Chief of Staff of the French Air Force
 Necdet Özel – Chief of Staff of the Turkish Armed Forces (2012)
 Zubair Mahmood Hayat – Pakistan's Chairman Joint Chiefs of Staff Committee
 Muhammad Zakaullah – Chief of the Naval Staff, Pakistan Navy (2 October 2017)
Tanvir Mahmood Ahmed - Chief of Air Staff, Pakistan Air Force 
Farooq Feroze Khan - Chairman Joint Chief of Staff Pakistan]
Sohail Aman - Chief of Air Staff, Pakistan Air Force (10 February 2018)
 Belal Shafiul Huq - Chief of Army Staff, Bangladesh Army (8 March 2018)
 Aziz Ahmed - Chief of Army Staff, Bangladesh Army (4 February 2018)

Others
 Krzysztof Płomiński – Polish diplomat
 Samar Al Homoud (King Abdulaziz Medal of First Class)

References

Further reading
 Guy Stair Sainty and Rafal Heydel-Mankoo, World Orders of Knighthood and Merit", London 2006.

External links
 Photos of the Order

1971 establishments in Saudi Arabia
Awards established in 1971
 
Civil awards and decorations of Saudi Arabia